Crawl with Me is the debut solo studio album by Art Bergmann, released July 5, 1988 on Duke Street Records.

The album had originally been recorded in demo form by Bob Rock and Paul Hyde, but the studio release was produced by John Cale. The album received generally favourable reviews, although critics noted that Cale's production had toned down Bergmann's signature guitar sound in favour of a more keyboard-oriented production.

At the Juno Awards of 1989, Bergmann was nominated for Most Promising Male Vocalist, and James O'Mara and Kate Ryan were nominated for Best Music Video for Bergmann's "Our Little Secret".

In 2009, Bergmann's bassist Ray Fulber remastered the original Rock and Hyde demos for release as the album Lost Art Bergmann.

Track listing
All songs written by Art Bergmann except where noted.

References

1988 debut albums
Art Bergmann albums
Albums produced by John Cale